Mujhay Sandal Kar Do is a Pakistani television series aired during 2011-12 on Hum TV. It is presented by Momina Duraid and features Fazila Qazi, Sonya Hussain, Janita Asma and Asma Abbas among others.

Cast 
Soniya Hussain
Fazila Kaiser
Asma Abbas
Janita Asma
Babar Khan

References

2011 Pakistani television series debuts
Pakistani drama television series
Urdu-language television shows
Hum TV original programming